Harirud Rural District is a rural district (dehestan) in Bujgan District, Torbat-e Jam County, Razavi Khorasan Province, Iran. At the 2006 census, its population was 4,430, in 951 families.  The rural district has 12 villages.

References 

Rural Districts of Razavi Khorasan Province
Torbat-e Jam County